Tommaso Zorzi (born 2 April 1995) is an Italian TV presenter, writer, TV personality and commentator.

Biography 
Tommaso Zorzi was born in 1995 in Milan to Lorenzo Zorzi and Armanda Frassinetti.

In 2016 he launched FashTime, a social network app dedicated to fashion, and subsequently AristoPop, a line of men's handbags and accessories. Later that year he debuted on television thanks to the docu-reality Riccanza, aired on MTV. He took part in all seasons of the program and in the spin-off #Riccanza Deluxe. In 2018 he participated as a contestant in the second season of Dance Dance Dance on Fox, and in the seventh season of Pechino Express.

In 2020 he hosted Adoro!, the pre-show of La pupa e il secchione e viceversa, along with Giulia Salemi, live streamed on Mediaset Play before each episode of the reality show. In the same year he released his first novel Siamo tutti bravi con i fidanzati degli altri, published by Mondadori. Between 2020 and 2021 he participated in the fifth season of Grande Fratello VIP, where he came out on top.

Again in 2021, he was a commentator in the fifteenth season of the reality show L'isola dei famosi, on Canale 5. Moreover, he was chosen as the host of Il Punto Z, a web show dedicated to the reality show. Since March 2021 he is a regular guest of Maurizio Costanzo Show and since May of the same year he is featured on R101, in the daily strip Facciamo finta che..., alongside Maurizio Costanzo and Carlotta Quadri. Also in that year, Zorzi launched his line of sex toys Tommyland, in collaboration with MySecretCase.

In June 2021 he was selected as a judge, together with actress, host and writer Chiara Francini and drag queen Priscilla (stage name of Mariano Gallo), for the TV program Drag Race Italia, the Italian version of RuPaul's Drag Race. The show premiered on the streaming platform Discovery+ at the end of 2021, and afterward on Real Time, as of January 9, 2022. Additionally, he was the host of After the Race, where he interviewed the eliminated contestants.

In April 2022 is announced by the BBC as the presenter of two new programs, "Questa è Casa Mia" and "Tailor Made - Chi ha la stoffa?", airing respectively from May 2022 on Real Time, and from June 2022 on Discovery+, and later as "free-to-air" from September 14, 2022 on Real Time.

Television

Radio 

 Facciamo finta che... (R101, since 2021) – regular guest

Filmography

Videoclips 

 Dress Code by Il Pagante (2018) – cameo

Books

Awards 

 2022 - Magna Grecia Awards in the category Best newcomer presenter

References

External links

  Wikiquote contains quotes by or on Tommaso Zorzi

Living people
Reality show winners
Italian drag queens
Drag Race Italia
1995 births